Haarlem oil, also called medicamentum gratia probatum, is a dietary supplement. The potion is a mixture of sulfur, herbs and terebinth oil. It is produced in Haarlem, Netherlands.

It was invented in 1696 by Claes Tilly and was marketed as a cure for many ailments.

The word haarlemmerolie (with a lowercase 'h') is now used in Dutch to indicate a fix for all problems. For example: "lowering taxes will be like haarlemmerolie for the economy". This is also used sarcastically.

Benefits to race horses -

- Greatly improves the urinary system and removes most toxins in the horse's system.

- Haarlem oil guarantees against infections, such as respiratory, urinary, biliary, and intestinal.

- Naturally stimulates the horse's own hormone secretions without side effects.

- Helps assist the rapid recovery process after the horse competes.

- Fights any and all arthritic actions.

References

External links
http://www.haarlemmerolie.nl/
Dietary Supplements

Haarlem
Dietary supplements